Cytandra vittata is a shrub in the African violet family Gesneriaceae with bright pink, candy-striped flowers. It was discovered in 2019 in New Guinea. It grows in rainforest. Doves and pigeons disperse its white berries.

References 

vittata